Beit Hazon (lit. Hazon House) is a predominantly English-speaking neighbourhood of Kfar Haroeh in central Israel.

History
The neighbourhood was formed by a group of immigrants from England, South Africa and the United States. It was named after Avrohom Yeshaya Karelitz, who was also known as Hazon Ish. In 2008, Beit Hazon residents submitted a request to be registered as an independent town. However, it was not recognized as a separate entity by the local authority, the Hefer Valley Regional Council.

Notable residents
David Bannett

References

Community settlements
Populated places in Central District (Israel)
American-Jewish culture in Israel
English-Jewish culture in Israel
South African-Jewish culture in Israel